Kassai and Luk (also called Kassai & Luk, Kassai and Leuk or Samba et Leuk on Télétoon, also stylized Samba & Leuk') is a children's television series by Marathon Media Group.  It was developed in 1996 and originally aired in English in 1997 on Teletoon, which classified it as a pre-school program. And in Mexico it was aired by Once Niños. Directed by Olivier Massart and inspired in La Belle Histoire de Leuk-le-Lièvre written by Abdoulaye Sadji and Léopold Sédar Senghor in 1953.

Premise
This short-lived animation series was based on African stories. The three protagonists are the young man Kassai, his sidekick Leuk, a talking humanoid hare who knows the jungle well, and Princess Marana, who is cursed to transform into a gazelle during the day. In the series, Kassai goes on various quests to find the scattered parts of his tribe's patron goddess, Koorie, and tries to stop the plans of the evil god Toguum, who can possess people to do his bidding. The opening theme "Samba Et Leuk" is performed by the African musician Ismaël Lô.

Characters
Kassai, a boy
Leuk (aka Luk), a hare. 
Marana, a girl who is cursed to become a gazelle by day, and return a girl at night
Maliba
Nommos
Ogotem
Togum (aka Togoum) voiced by John Stocker

Episodes
There are 26 episodes.

References

External links

1990s French animated television series
Animated television series about rabbits and hares